Felix Omoruyi Irorere (born 21 June 2002) is a French professional footballer who plays as a centre-back for  club Karlsruher SC.

Career
Born in Saint-Denis, France, Irorere played youth football for Schwarz Weiß Griesheim, before joining Eintracht Frankfurt's academy in 2013. In October 2018, Irorere signed a scholarship contract with the club until 2020, with the option of a professional contract. He signed a professional contract with the club in 2020 but his development was set back by two meniscus tears in 2019 and 2021. In August 2021, he signed for 2. Bundesliga club Karlsruher SC on a two-year contract.

References

External links

2002 births
Living people
Sportspeople from Saint-Denis, Seine-Saint-Denis
German footballers
Footballers from Seine-Saint-Denis
Association football central defenders
Eintracht Frankfurt players
Karlsruher SC players
2. Bundesliga players